Shiloh is a city on the northeastern edge of Harris County, Georgia, United States. It is part of the Columbus, Georgia–Alabama Metropolitan Statistical Area. As of the 2020 census, the population was 402.

History
A post office called Shiloh was established in 1874. The community was named after the local Shiloh Baptist Church, which in turn took its name from Shiloh, a place mentioned in the Hebrew Bible.

The Georgia General Assembly incorporated Shiloh in 1961.

Geography
Shiloh is located in the northeast corner of Harris County along Alternate U.S. Route 27, which leads southwest  to Columbus and north  to Warm Springs. Georgia State Route 85 runs east of the city, leading northeast  to Manchester. Georgia State Route 116 intersects Alternate U.S. Route 27 in the city, leading east  to Woodland and west  to Hamilton. The city is located in the Piedmont region of the state.

Demographics

As of the census of 2000, there were 423 people, 158 households, and 127 families residing in the city. The racial makeup of the city was 68.79% White, 29.79% African American, 0.47% Native American, 0.00% from other races, and 0.95% from two or more races. Hispanic or Latino of any race were 0.47% of the population.

There were 158 households, out of which 39.2% had children under the age of 18 living with them, 56.3% were married couples living together, 20.9% had a female householder with no husband present, and 19.0% were non-families. 17.1% of all households were made up of individuals, and 4.4% had someone living alone who was 65 years of age or older.  The average household size was 2.68 and the average family size was 3.02.

In the city, the population was spread out, with 27.7% under the age of 18, 10.4% from 18 to 24, 28.6% from 25 to 44, 22.5% from 45 to 64, and 10.9% who were 65 years of age or older.  The median age was 34 years. For every 100 females, there were 80.8 males.  For every 100 females age 18 and over, there were 80.0 males.

The median income for a household in the city was $31,563, and the median income for a family was $31,250. Males had a median income of $31,250 versus $16,250 for females. The per capita income for the city was $13,983.  About 13.4% of families and 12.3% of the population were below the poverty line, including 11.3% of those under the age of 18 and 20.0% ages 65 or older.

See also

 List of cities in Georgia (U.S. state)
 National Register of Historic Places listings in Harris County, Georgia

References

External links

Cities in Georgia (U.S. state)
Cities in Harris County, Georgia